The 1934 World Series was the championship series in Major League Baseball for the 1934 season. The 31st edition of the World Series, it matched the St. Louis Cardinals against the Detroit Tigers. The Cardinals' "Gashouse Gang" won in seven games for their third championship in eight years.

The Cardinals and Tigers split the first two games in Detroit, and Detroit took two of the next three in St. Louis. But St. Louis won the next two in Detroit, including an 11–0 embarrassment in Game 7 to win the Series. The stars for the Cardinals were Joe ("Ducky") Medwick, who hit .379, a Series-high five RBI and one of St. Louis' two home runs, and the meteoric ("Me 'n' Paul") Dean brothers, Dizzy and Paul (or "Daffy") Dean, who won two games apiece with 28 strikeouts and a minuscule 1.43 earned run average. 1934 was the last World Series in which both teams were led by player-managers.

Tiger pitcher Denny McLain, winner of Game 6 in 1968 (coasting home on the Tigers' record-tying ten-run second inning rally on the road), had gone 31–6 during the season, upstaging "Diz" with his mere 30–7 that year, who at 57 went onto the Tiger Stadium field in a big cowboy hat to be photographed with McLain moments after the walk-off hit that had given the latter his thirtieth win of the season. As of 2021, they are the last two 30-game winners in the major leagues.

The Cardinals, led by the Dean brothers, used only six other pitchers in amassing a team earned-run average of 2.34 for their 1934 Series victory,

Pete Fox played for the losing team, yet became the only player in Series history, to hit six doubles in a World Series.

For his top-of-the-sixth triple in Game 7, Joe Medwick slid hard into Tiger third baseman Marv Owen. They tangled briefly, and when Medwick went back to his position in left field for the bottom of the inning enraged Tiger fans, knowing the game was all but lost (the score was 9–0 by then), vented their frustrations on him, pelting him with fruit, vegetables, bottles and cushions among other things.  It was a feat for him to make the catch of a fly ball instead of the orange thrown close to it. Commissioner Landis ordered Medwick out of the game, ending the ruckus.  Newsreel footage shows Medwick slamming his glove against the dugout bench in disgust.  It was the only time a Commissioner has ejected a player from any major league game, .(Audio)

Dizzy Dean nearly took himself out of the Series on a play in Game 4. In the fourth inning, he pinch-ran and broke up a double play the hard way; i.e., by taking the errant relay throw to first flush on the noggin. The great Dean lay unconscious on the field.  (He was later to protest, "Hell, it was only a glancing blow.")  He was rushed to a hospital for observation, where he was given a clean bill of health. Legend has it that at least one newspaper the next day featured the headline, "X-ray of Dean's head shows nothing." Be that as it may, ol' Diz recovered rapidly enough to start Game 5 (a 3–1 loss to Tiger curveballer Tommy Bridges) the very next day.

According to Charles Einstein's The Fireside Book of Baseball, in the midst of the Cardinals' Game 7 rout, player-manager Frankie Frisch, the "Fordham Flash", called time and walked out to the mound from second base to warn Diz, "If you don't stop clowning around, I'll take you out of the game." Dizzy said, "No you won't." Frisch thought about this a moment, then retreated to second.

Summary

Matchups

Game 1

The series opener in Detroit pitted the Cardinals' 30-game winner, Dizzy Dean, against the Tigers' "General" Crowder. The subpar Tiger defense behind the General let him down with five errors and three unearned runs.

In the top of the second, the Gashouse Gang loaded the bases with a single and two errors; a single by Jack Rothrock then brought home both Ernie Orsatti and Dean to make it 2–0. In the third inning, St. Louis tacked on another run due to more shoddy Detroit fielding. Medwick singled and was forced out at second by Ripper Collins, but a throwing error by Tiger shortstop Billy Rogell allowed Collins to move to second and then score on another error by Detroit's star first baseman, Hank Greenberg. In the bottom of the third, Charlie Gehringer got the Tigers on the board with a single that drove in Jo-Jo White, but in the St. Louis fifth Medwick tattooed a home run off Crowder for a 4–1 Cardinal lead.

The Gang then exploded for a four-run sixth off Firpo Marberry (who had relieved Crowder) and Elon Hogsett, as Pepper Martin and Medwick each cracked RBI singles and Bill DeLancey lashed a two-run double to left. Though Detroit put up single runs in the sixth and eighth (via a Goose Goslin single that scored Greenberg and a home run by Greenberg), they could get no closer, as Dean struck out Gee Walker to give St. Louis an 8–3 win and a 1–0 lead in the series.

Game 2

The second game of the Series was much closer than the first, pitting the Cardinals' Bill Hallahan against the Tigers' Schoolboy Rowe.

In the top of the second, St. Louis drew first blood on DeLancey's single and Orsatti's triple. They added another run in the third as a Medwick single brought in Martin, but the Tigers came back and edged them 3–2 in 12 innings.

Game 3

The Tigers left 13 men on base as Pepper Martin's double, triple and two runs scored enabled the Cardinals to win, 4-1.

Game 4

The Tigers evened the series, winning 10-4, with five runs in the eighth. Hank Greenberg had four hits and three RBI and Billy Rogell had four RBI.

This game was the first time that the song, "Take Me Out to the Ball Game", was played during the World Series, after being played at a high school game earlier that year in Los Angeles.

Game 5

Tommy Bridges won after just one day of rest. Charlie Gehringer's home run in the sixth was the game-winning hit.

Game 6

Paul Dean won his second game of the series and helped his own cause with a game-winning single in the seventh inning.

Game 7

The Cardinals easily won Game 7, 11–0, behind Dizzy Dean. Ducky Medwick was taken out of the game for own safety after sliding hard into third baseman Marv Owen and being pelted by the crowd with bottles and fruit when he took the field in the sixth inning.

Composite line score
1934 World Series (4–3): St. Louis Cardinals (N.L.) over Detroit Tigers (A.L.)

Brothers
Other brothers who appeared in the same World Series, either as teammates or opponents, before the Deans were: 
 – Doc Johnston and Jimmy Johnston
 – Bob Meusel and Irish Meusel (and )
 – Paul Waner and Lloyd Waner

Notes

References

External links

 Detroit Tigers History

World Series
World Series
St. Louis Cardinals postseason
Detroit Tigers postseason
World Series
World Series
1934 in Detroit
1930s in St. Louis
October 1934 sports events
Baseball competitions in Detroit
Baseball competitions in St. Louis